John Vereker may refer to:
John Vereker, 3rd Viscount Gort (1790–1865), Irish peer and politician
John Vereker, 5th Viscount Gort (1849–1902), Anglo-Irish peer, landowner and Army officer
John Vereker, 6th Viscount Gort (1886–1946), British Army officer
John Vereker (governor) (born 1944), Governor of Bermuda